The southern shovelnose ray, western shovelnose ray, or yellow shovelnose ray (Aptychotrema vincentiana) is a species of fish in the Rhinobatidae family. It is endemic to southern Australia.  Its natural habitats are open seas and shallow seas.

References 

southern shovelnose ray
Fauna of South Australia
southern shovelnose ray
Taxonomy articles created by Polbot